Laptev Log is a rural locality (a selo) and the administrative center of Laptevsky Selsoviet, Uglovsky District, Altai Krai, Russia. The population was 756 as of 2013. It was founded in 1888. There are 6 streets.

Geography 
Laptev Log is located 56 km south of Uglovskoye (the district's administrative centre) by road. Borisovka is the nearest rural locality.

References 

Rural localities in Uglovsky District, Altai Krai